Eutropis tytleri (common name: Tytler's mabuya) is a species of skink, a lizard in the family Scincidae. The species is endemic to the Andaman Islands, India.

Etymology and Taxonomy
E. tytleri is named after British naturalist Robert Christopher Tytler, who probably collected the type. It was described by the British naturualist William Theobald in 1868, who was employed by the Geological Survey of India at the time.

Habitat
It can be found in native broadleaf forests, agricultural fields, coconut plantations, and around human dwellings and gardens.

Description
The tail is long, from 1.5 to 2.2 times SVL. Dorsally, it is bronzish brown. Ventrally, it is light yellow. E. tytleri is thought to be the largest extant skink species native to the Indian subcontinent.

Behavior
E. tytleri is crepuscular.

Diet
E. tytleri preys upon insects, frogs, and small reptiles.

Reproduction
The mode of reproduction of E. tytleri is unknown.

Relationship with humans
While the forests to which E. tytleri lives appear to be shrinking as human use of its habitat increases, this species population does not appear to be in decline. E. tytleri appears able to adapt to new, human-created habitats and is known to inhabit many human-used spaces.Furthermore, this skink is not known to be utilized by people and does not appear to be under any specific threat.

References

Further reading
Boulenger GA (1887). Catalogue of the Lizards in the British Museum (Natural History). Second Edition. Volume III. ... Scincidæ ... London: Trustees of the British Museum (Natural History). (Taylor and Francis, printers). xii + 575 pp. + Plates I-XL. (Mabuia tytleri, p. 187).
Boulenger GA (1890). The Fauna of British India, Including Ceylon and Burma. Reptilia and Batrachia. London; Secretary of State for India in Council. (Taylor and Francis, printers). xviii + 541 pp. (Mabuia tytleri, pp. 191–192).
Das I (2002). A Photographic Guide to Snakes and other Reptiles of India. Sanibel Island Florida: Ralph Curtis Books. 144 pp. . (Mabuya tytleri, p. 112).
Smith MA (1935). The Fauna of British India, Including Ceylon and Burma. Reptilia and Amphibia. Vol. II.—Sauria. London: Secretary of State for India in Council. (Taylor and Francis, printers). xiii + 440 pp. + Plate I + 2 maps. (Mabuya tytleri, p. 270).

Eutropis
Reptiles of India
Fauna of the Andaman and Nicobar Islands
Endemic fauna of India
Taxa named by William Theobald
Reptiles described in 1868